The Órbigo River is a river in the provinces of León and Zamora, Spain. It begins at the convergence of the Luna River and the Omaña River in the town of Secarejo, in the Cimanes del Tejar municipality. Decades ago, that confluence was some km. before, in the town of Santiago del Molinillo. It flows from north to south through the province of León and ultimately flows into the Esla River below Benavente.

How the river came to have this name is not known. According to the linguist E. Bascuas, the toponym Órbigo, would come from a Paleo-European hydronymic theme *urw-, derived from the Indo-European root *er- 'flow, move', with a hydronymic meaning. The first mention is from Hydatius "Ad fluvium nomine Urbicum". There exists a theory that the river now called the Luna should be the real start of the Órbigo. Although it was the same river, in the times of the Conde Luna, it was ordered to change that name of the river so that the part in the county would have its name.

Tributaries
Duerna
Tuerto
Jamuz
Eria
Special tributary: Presa Cerrajera, which splits from the Órbigo and later flows into it again

Gallery

See also 
 List of rivers of Spain

References 

Rivers of Spain
Rivers of León, Spain
Rivers of Castile and León
Tributaries of the Esla